Former U.S. president, businessman, and television personality Donald Trump currently has six residences.

Trump grew up in Jamaica Estates, an affluent neighborhood in Queens, New York City. During his time at the New York Military Academy, he lived on campus; he later rented row houses in college. In 1971, Trump moved to a studio on 75th Street in Manhattan. Since the completion of Trump Tower in 1983, Trump had lived in a three-level penthouse on the top floors. He purchased the Seven Springs mansion in Bedford, New York, in 1995. Upon Trump's election to the U.S. presidency, he moved into the White House in Washington, D.C. From his birth in 1946 until 2019, Trump listed his primary state of residence as New York; in September 2019, Donald and Melania moved their primary residence to Mar-a-Lago in Florida. On January 20, 2021, Trump moved out of the White House preceding the inauguration of Joe Biden.

Current residences

Mar-a-Lago 

Since September 2019, Trump's resort and residence Mar-a-Lago has served as the primary residence for Donald and Melania Trump.

Trump Tower penthouse

The three-story penthouse at Trump Tower was Trump's primary and main residence until September 2019 when Trump designated Mar-a-Lago his primary residence. In 2017, Forbes magazine estimated the 11,000 sq.ft. penthouse to be worth $64 million. The interior was originally designed by Angelo Donghia with black lacquered walls, brass, and mahogany but was later redesigned in Louis XIV-style with gold-trimmed furniture, marble floors, columns, tables, and walls, frescoed ceilings, bronze statues, and crystal chandeliers.

Trump National Golf Club Bedminster

A villa on the premises is reserved for Trump's exclusive use, and a 500-square-foot, two-story balcony and porch were added to it in 2017.  In 2017, the place was designated as Trump's third presidential residence.

Seven Springs
The mansion has sixty rooms, including thirteen bedrooms, twelve baths, and an indoor pool of white marble. There are two other pools on the grounds, as well as a glass and stone orangery for growing citrus, with a bowling alley in its basement. The grounds are accented with a formal garden pavilion, a fountain in the front lawn, a greenhouse and root cellar, and a stone water tower. The property also contains a Tudor Revival house known as "Nonesuch", formerly owned by the Heinz family.

Seven Springs was formerly a summer home of Eugene Meyer and his family, including his daughter Katharine Graham. In 1919, Meyer had the mansion built of sandstone from the property to a design by artist and architect Charles A. Platt. He spent $2 million constructing it. Meyer died in 1959, and after his wife's death in 1970, the family foundation gave  of land to The Nature Conservancy and the rest of the property first to Yale University and then to Rockefeller University, which used it as a conference center.  Trump purchased the property in 1995 for $7.5 million.  The mansion was in need of renovation, but Eric Trump and Donald Trump Jr. spent summers and weekends at the property, living in one of the carriage houses. They would ride ATVs, fish in Byram Lake, and help with construction work. Eric Trump described the property as a "home base" and Forbes called it a "family retreat". Trump’s tax records showed he classified the estate as an investment property which enables property taxes to be written off.

Development plans
Trump originally planned to build a golf course on the property, but was opposed by the governments of the three municipalities the property lies within, and he wanted to avoid competing with his existing course nearby in Briarcliff Manor. He later explored renovating the two houses and redeveloping the rest of the property to build first 46 single-family houses, and in 2004, fifteen $25-million mansions. These plans were abandoned, and in 2015, Trump granted a conservation easement to a conservation land trust to preserve  of meadows and mature forest.

Trump Parc
Donald Trump developed the 38-story Trump Parc condominium skyscraper at 106 Central Park South, and often privately owns multiple units within it, which he rents for up to $100,000 a month.

Trump Park Avenue
Trump has several apartments at Trump Park Avenue.  The penthouse, which was owned by Trump and where his daughter Ivanka and her family lived from 2011 until January 2017, was sold to Chinese-American businesswoman Angela Chen for 15.9 million dollars in February 2017.

Former residences

White House

Donald Trump lived at the presidential mansion, the White House in Washington, D.C. during his presidency. His wife Melania and their son Barron remained at Trump Tower until the end of Barron's 2016–2017 school year.

Queens, New York City

Trump lived with his family in Jamaica Estates, an affluent suburban neighborhood in Queens, New York. They lived at 85-15 Wareham Place until he was four. The house, a six-bedroom neo-Tudor, was built in 1940 by his father Fred Trump. In 1950, the family moved into a 23-room mansion Fred Trump built on two adjoining lots on Midland Parkway, directly behind the backyard of the house on Wareham Place. Trump's parents lived in the house for the rest of their lives.

School living

Beginning at age 13, Trump attended and resided at New York Military Academy, a private boarding school in Cornwall, New York. He subsequently attended Fordham University for two years and transferred to the Wharton School at the University of Pennsylvania, where he lived in rented off-campus row houses.

Manhattan penthouse
Around the 1970s Trump lived in a penthouse apartment at the Phoenix, a luxury apartment building on 65th Street in the Upper East Side in Manhattan. The apartment had large panoramic windows; he decorated the interior in beige, brown, and chrome.

Greenwich mansion
Trump purchased a  mansion in Greenwich, Connecticut, in 1982 for $4 million. The house had eight bedrooms, eleven baths, a  guest house, a putting green and tennis court, indoor and outdoor pools, and a sauna. Ivana Trump received the mansion as part of the settlement in her 1991 divorce from Donald Trump. She sold it for $15 million in 1998.

Fifth Avenue apartment
Donald and Ivana Trump (his wife at the time) lived in an apartment on Manhattan's Fifth Avenue, which was decorated with beige velvet sofas and goatskin tables. According to family friend Nikki Haskell, Donald and Ivana lived in Olympic Tower prior to moving to 800 Fifth Avenue.

Virginia residence
Trump has a residence at Trump Vineyard Estates, a 45-room  mansion.

Beverly Hills
Trump owned a five-bedroom mansion on North Rodeo Drive in Beverly Hills, California from 2007 to 2019. Trump had rarely used it, and had put on the market and rented it out at different times. In June 2019, he quietly sold the property, off-market, for $13.5 million. He had originally purchased it for $7 million.

From 2008 to 2009, Trump owned a neighboring house, an 11-bedroom Greek Revival mansion built in 1981. Trump purchased it for $10.35 million, but sold it for $9.5 million. It was previously a residence of Gabonese president Omar Bongo, who died in office in 2009.

See also

 List of residences of presidents of the United States

References

Works cited

Donald Trump
Trump, Donald
Trump family residences